Ashton railway station was a station in Devon, opened by the Great Western Railway (GWR) in 1882 and closed in 1958

Ashton railway station may also refer to:

 Ashton and Hooley Hill railway station, now known as Guide Bridge railway station, opened by the Sheffield, Ashton-under-Lyne and Manchester Railway in 1841
 Ashton Gate railway station, opened by the GWR in 1906 and closed in 1964, with occasional use until 1974
 Ashton Hall railway station, opened by the London and North Western Railway in 1883 as Mr Starkie's Platform and closed in 1930
 Ashton-in-Makerfield railway station, opened by the Liverpool, St Helens and South Lancashire Railway in 1900 and closed in 1952
 Ashton Moss railway station, opened by the Oldham, Ashton and Guide Bridge Railway (OA&GB) in 1861 and closed in 1862
 Ashton Oldham Road railway station, opened by the OA&GB in 1861 and closed in 1960
 Ashton Park Parade railway station, opened by the Manchester, Sheffield and Lincolnshire Railway in 1845 and closed in 1956
 Ashton-under-Hill railway station, opened by the Midland Railway in 1864 and closed in 1963
 Ashton-under-Lyne railway station, opened by the Lancashire and Yorkshire Railway in 1846 as Ashton Charlestown
 Long Ashton railway station, originally known as Ashton, opened by the Bristol and Exeter Railway in 1841 or 1852 and closed in 1856